The canton of Montigny-en-Gohelle  is a former canton situated in the department of the Pas-de-Calais and in the Nord-Pas-de-Calais region of northern France. It was disbanded following the French canton reorganisation which came into effect in March 2015. It consisted of 2 communes, which joined the canton of Hénin-Beaumont-1 in 2015. It had a total of 19,738 inhabitants (2012).

Geography 
The canton is organised around Montigny-en-Gohelle in the arrondissement of Lens. The altitude varies from 23m to 65m at Montigny-en-Gohelle for an average altitude of 37m.

The canton comprised 2 communes:
Hénin-Beaumont (partly)
Montigny-en-Gohelle

See also 
Cantons of Pas-de-Calais 
Communes of Pas-de-Calais 
Arrondissements of the Pas-de-Calais department

References

Montigny-en-Gohelle
2015 disestablishments in France
States and territories disestablished in 2015